Richard Langworth was an English  priest, most notably the sixth Dean of Chester. He died at Holborn in 1579.

Notes

1579 deaths
16th-century English people
Deans of Chester
Year of birth missing